The Mystery Project was produced by CBC Radio (Canada). It aired every Saturday night on CBC Radio One (6:30 p.m. for most of Canada, 7:30 p.m. Maritimes, 8:00 p.m. Nfld.), and was repeated at 3:30 p.m. the following Mondays on The Roundup, also on Radio One. 

The series ran from 1992 until 2002. Each week, casual listeners got to puzzle through a fully dramatized radio-play with a resolved plot, while regular listeners had the added fun of following familiar characters' further adventures. The series was created by the Executive Producer, Bill Howell. Barry Morgan was the co-ordinating producer. With Host Bob Boving.

To view a complete log of all the shows aired please refer to this page Goeff's CBC Mystery Project

Series
Among the many series featured were:
 In The Blood by Paul Ledoux(8 eps)
 Midnight Cab by James W. Nichol(39 eps)
 Death Downtown by Paul Milliken(3 eps)
 Flynn by Lyal and Barbara Brown(13 eps)
 Pocket City Blues by Charles Tidler(4 eps)
 House Detective Becker by Martin Kinch(13 eps in 12 plays, the last of which was in two parts)
 Albert's Father by Henry Comor(5 eps)
 Clean Sweep by Alf Silver(30 eps)
 Bailey's Way by Gordon Pengilly(13 eps)
 Recipe for Murder by Don Druick(8 eps)
 The Old Guy by Paul Ledoux
 Fallaway Ridge by Eve Crawford and Cathy Dunphy(4 eps)
 The Investigations of Quentin Nickles by John Richard Wright(20 eps)(the last 3 eps never broadcast)
 Peggy Delaney by James W. Nichol(39 eps)

References 

CBC Radio One programs
Canadian radio dramas
Anthology radio series